Nebria trifaria is a species of brown coloured ground beetle in the  Nebriinae subfamily that can be found in such US states as  California, Montana, Utah, and Wyoming.

References

trifaria
Beetles described in 1878
Beetles of North America
Endemic fauna of the United States